Chaulnes is a railway station located in the commune of Chaulnes in the Somme department, France. The station is served by TER Hauts-de-France trains from Amiens to Laon. Its elevation is 94 m.

History
Formerly, the station was also connected to a railway line from Paris-Nord to Cambrai via Saint-Just-en-Chaussée, Montdidier, Chaulnes and Roisel. The sections between Saint-Just-en-Chaussée and Roye, and between Péronne and Épehy have been dismantled, and the line has been partly replaced by bus services to Montdidier and Roisel.

See also
List of SNCF stations in Hauts-de-France

References

Railway stations in Somme (department)
Railway stations in France opened in 1867